Moraleja is a municipality located in the province of Cáceres, Extremadura, Spain. It is the most important town in the Sierra de Gata comarca. The Postal Code is 10128.

The Town Hall is currently heavily indebted.
This municipality is included in the Sierra de Gata comarca, although it is in the Árrago River basin, geographically not in the mountainous area of the Sierra de Gata.

Villages
Moraleja 
Cañadas
Malladas
La Mata
Pedrizas
Porciones
La Quinta
Rozacorderos

References

External links 
 Ayuntamiento de Moraleja

Municipalities in the Province of Cáceres